Fulvia is a genus of cockles, marine bivalve molluscs in the family Cardiidae. Most species are found in the Indo-Pacific and in Australian waters.

Species
The genus includes the following species according to the World Register of Marine Species:
Subgenus Fulvia
Fulvia aperta (Bruguière, 1789)
Fulvia australis  (G.B. Sowerby II, 1834)
Fulvia boholensis  Vidal, 1994
Fulvia colorata  Vidal & Kirkendale, 2007
Fulvia dulcis  (Deshayes, 1863)
 Fulvia fragiformis Vidal, 1994
Fulvia fragilis  (Forsskål in Niebuhr, 1775)
 Fulvia kaarei ter Poorten & Hylleberg, 2017
Fulvia laevigata  (Linnaeus, 1758)
Fulvia mutica  (Reeve, 1844)
Fulvia natalensis  (Krauss, 1848)
 Fulvia nienkeae ter Poorten, 2012
 Fulvia scalata Vidal, 1994
Fulvia tenuicostata  (Lamarck, 1819)
Subgenus Laevifulvia
Fulvia hungerfordi  (G.B. Sowerby III, 1901)
Fulvia lineonotata  Vidal, 1994
Fulvia subquadrata  Vidal & Kirkendale, 2007
Fulvia undatopicta  (Pilsbry, 1904)
 Synonyms:
Fulvia vepris  Vidal & Kirkendale, 2007: synonym of Europicardium vepris (Vidal & Kirkendale, 2007)
Fulvia papyracea  (Bruguière, 1789): synonym of Fulvia laevigata (Linnaeus, 1758)

References

}
Cardiidae
Bivalve genera